Rodolfo Hernández Suárez (born 26 March 1945) is a Colombian politician, civil engineer, and businessman who served as a senator of Colombia from July to August 2022. He was mayor of Bucaramanga from 2016 until his resignation in 2019. As the nominee for the League of Anti-Corruption Governors (LIGA) coalition, Hernández placed second in the first round of the 2022 Colombian presidential election and he was ultimately defeated by Gustavo Petro in the second round run-off election. Hernández then accepted a senate seat offered to the runner-up in a presidential election and took office on 20 July. Equating his role in the senate to Lionel Messi as a goalkeeper, Hernández resigned his seat after serving for less than four months, citing incompatibility with the position. His departure fueled widespread speculation that he intended to run for office in his department of Santander. 

After his defeat, Hernández applied for LIGA to be granted legal party status by the National Electoral Council. LIGA became a party on 4 August 2022 and Hernández became the party's president. He is the owner of the company Constructora HG.

Biography 
Hernández was born in Piedecuesta, department of Santander, in 1945, and was raised in nearby Bucaramanga.

Prior to his entry into politics, he was a civil engineer from 1971 following his graduation from the National University of Colombia, and worked a career in the construction industry as an entrepreneur through the 1990s via his company HG Constructora, mainly focusing on affordable housing in Bucaramanga and the surrounding area, earning over US$100 million.

His father was kidnapped and held for 135 days by the Revolutionary Armed Forces of Colombia (FARC-EP), and Juliana, one of his four children, was kidnapped and presumably killed by the National Liberation Army (ELN) in 2004, after he refused to pay the ransom, arguing it would put the rest of his family at a higher risk of kidnapping.

Hernández entered politics and was first a member of the Colombian Liberal Party. He served as a local councilor for Piedecuesta from 1990 to 1992. In 2011, he financed and campaigned for Lucho Bohórquez, a member of the Colombian Liberal Party, who ended up winning the mayoral election of Bucaramanga.

Hernández ran for mayor of Bucaramanga in 2015, financing his own campaign and winning the mayoral election. He served as mayor of Bucaramanga from 2016 to 2019. As mayor, he became known nationally for weekly Facebook broadcasts in which he answered questions from citizens, and for his public fights with city councilors which he accused of being thieving "rats". He also received recognition by giving his salary to public university students. On different occasions, he met with community leaders and youth leaders. In 2018, he was suspended for three months for slapping a councilor. In 2019, the Office of the Attorney General sanctioned him for alleged improper participation in politics while holding the mayoral office, which Hernández responded to by resigning from the position. During his tenure, he became known as a campaigner against corruption, and when he left office, he had an approval rating of 84%. He is also facing a judicial process for alleged irregularities in the execution of a consulting contract to implement new technologies for waste management in the El Carrasco landfill, which he would have incurred as mayor of Bucaramanga.

Hernández has previously caused controversy among the Venezuelan expat community in the country after stating Venezuelan women were often "baby factories" who would need to be supported by the state. He also caused controversy, when he said, during a 2016 interview, "I am a follower of a great German thinker, named Adolf Hitler." He later apologized and said he meant to say Albert Einstein.

2022 presidential campaign 
Hernández declared his candidacy in 2022 as an independent, with Marelen Castillo as his running-mate. He finished second in the first round of the 2022 presidential elections with 28% of the vote, advancing to a runoff on 19 June 2022, facing Gustavo Petro. After the first round, Hernández expressed gratitude to everyone who voted for him, saying; "To those who voted for me, I tell you now, I won't fail you." He received the backing of the third-placed candidate Federico Gutiérrez, for the second round, urging voters "to keep Petro out".

He has campaigned against the corruption of the traditional political class and emphasized his image as a successful entrepreneur who can transform Colombia. He promised to "clean" the country of corruption. He has also promised "major budget cuts," eliminating the use of presidential planes and helicopters and donating all the money he receives as president. He said he would give financial rewards to citizens who report corrupt state officials. He has pledged to strengthen law and order and create jobs. He has in addition praised Andrés Manuel López Obrador during the campaign for his "anti-corruption efforts." He intends to improve the country's prison infrastructure and will restructure the National Penitentiary and Prison Institute, expressing zero tolerance for crime. He has said that in terms of decent housing, he will close the housing deficit in rural and urban areas. He has been dubbed as the 'king of TikTok' on several occasions because of his large following and his extensive campaign during the 2022 presidential election on TikTok.

Hernández lost to Petro in the second round. In his concession speech, Hernández stated, "I accept the result as it should be if we want our institutions to be strong. I sincerely hope that this decision that has been taken is beneficial for all and that Colombia is heading towards the change that prevailed in the vote in the first round". He then called Petro to congratulate him and urged Petro to maintain his commitment to combatting corruption and not to "disappoint those who trust him".

Senator (2022) 
On 23 June, Hernández accepted a senate seat offered to the runner-up in a presidential election. However, he indicated his intention to seek office in Santander in 2023 and suggested that his senate tenure may last for no more than a few months. He, along with all members of Congress, were sworn in on 20 July. Hernández claimed his presence in the senate was like having Lionel Messi as a goalkeeper. However, he resigned from the upper house on 25 October, saying that the position was "not right" for him. His departure fueled speculation that he intended to run for the governorship of Santander; Hernández also spoke about potentially running for mayor in a city in his home department.

Party status of LIGA 

On 19 July 2022, Hernández submitted a request to the National Electoral Council (CNE) to grant LIGA legal status as a political party. In the application, Hernández emphasised coming second place in the presidential election as the LIGA nominee and mentioned that he and his running mate Castillo had taken their respective seats in the senate and chamber of representatives awarded to the runner-up ticket. He also referred to the convention held by LIGA, which declared its opposition to the coalition government of Gustavo Petro. The CNE granted LIGA party status on 4 August, the same day, Hernández assumed the role of the party's president. He subsequently appointed his wife, Socorro Oliveros as the national director of LIGA.

Political positions 
Hernández does not claim to be on the right or the left, with NACLA describing his political position as a pragmatic centrist, Reuters describing him as centre-right, The New York Times describing him as right-wing, while other analysts have struggled to label him. Patricia Muñoz, a political analyst at Pontifical Xavierian University, evaluated Hernández's political positions as syncretic, saying; "If you had to place him on an ideological spectrum, most would say he's centre-right or right-wing, but when you look at his proposals, they're eclectic." He has been described as a populist and compared to Donald Trump and Silvio Berlusconi because he has emphasized his image as a successful businessman who can transform Colombia and often uses obscene language against the political establishment of his country.

Hernández declares that he is in favor of same-sex marriage, adoption of children by same-sex couples, legalization of medical and recreational marijuana, euthanasia and assisted suicide. Regarding abortion, he assures that in an eventual government of his the right to abortion will be totally respected and affirms that "it is the woman's decision whether to have an abortion or not". He supports: lowering the value-added tax from 19% to 10%; a basic income for all senior citizens regardless of past contributions or lack thereof, and potentially those near or below the poverty line. He also supports: progressively writing off debt for students in the lower classes, known as estrato 1 and 2, while also including active students, and those with the best grades. He has pledged increased access to higher education in the regions; universal health care; switching from a punitive to a rehabilitative attitude towards drug addiction; granting Olympians and world record holders from Colombia state pensions; increasing social payments for successful sportspeople to up to 100,000 pesos per day; a 50% quota for women in public service and the presidential cabinet; welfare payments for those that maintain and take care of forested areas; as well as limiting fracking unless it meets environmental conditions. Regarding the Colombian peace process, he has stated that he will fully implement the FARC peace deal and has expressed willingness to add an addendum to the FARC peace deal to include the National Liberation Army. He is in favour of restoring consular relations with Venezuela to address the violence on the border, saying; “Consular relations are necessary for good circulation, both commercial and touristic, and also because the border is where the increase in violence that Colombia is experiencing is also most felt.”

Notes

References

Footnotes 

Living people
1945 births
People from Santander Department
National University of Colombia alumni
Mayors of places in Colombia
20th-century Colombian businesspeople
21st-century Colombian politicians
Colombian business executives
Members of the Senate of Colombia